In multiphase flow in porous media, the relative permeability of a phase is a dimensionless measure of the effective permeability of that phase. It is the ratio of the effective permeability of that phase to the absolute permeability.  It can be viewed as an adaptation of Darcy's law to multiphase flow.

For two-phase flow in porous media given steady-state conditions, we can write

where  is the flux,  is the pressure drop,  is the viscosity. The subscript  indicates that the parameters are for phase .

 is here the phase permeability (i.e., the effective permeability of phase ), as observed through the equation above.

where  is the permeability of the porous medium in single-phase flow, i.e., the absolute permeability. Relative permeability must be between zero and one.

In applications, relative permeability is often represented as a function of water saturation; however, owing to capillary hysteresis one often resorts to a function or curve measured under drainage and another measured under imbibition.

Under this approach, the flow of each phase is inhibited by the presence of the other phases. Thus the sum of relative permeabilities over all phases is less than 1. However, apparent relative permeabilities larger than 1 have been obtained since the Darcean approach disregards the viscous coupling effects derived from momentum transfer between the phases (see assumptions below). This coupling could enhance the flow instead of inhibit it. This has been observed in heavy oil petroleum reservoirs when the gas phase flows as bubbles or patches (disconnected).

Modelling assumptions 
The above form for Darcy's law is sometimes also called Darcy's extended law, formulated for horizontal, one-dimensional, immiscible multiphase flow in homogeneous and isotropic porous media. The interactions between the fluids are neglected, so this model assumes that the solid porous media and the other fluids form a new porous matrix through which a phase can flow, implying that the fluid-fluid interfaces remain static in steady-state flow, which is not true, but this approximation has proven useful anyway.

Each of the phase saturations must be larger than the irreducible saturation, and each phase is assumed continuous within the porous medium.

Based on data from special core analysis laboratory (SCAL) experiments, simplified models of relative permeability as a function of saturation (e.g. water saturation) can be constructed. This article will focus on an oil-water system.

Saturation scaling 
Water saturation  is the fraction of porevolume that is filled with water, and similar for oil saturation . Thus, saturations are in itselves scaled properties or variables. This gives the constraint

The model functions or correlations for relative permeabilities in an oil-water system are therefore usually written as functions of only water saturation, and this makes it natural to select water saturation as the horizontal axis in graphical presentations. Let  (also denoted  and sometimes ) be the irreducible (or minimal or connate) water saturation, and let  be the residual (minimal) oil saturation after water flooding (imbibition). The flowing water saturation window in a water invasion / injection / imbibition process is bounded by a minimum value  and a maximum value . In mathematical terms the flowing saturation window is written as

By scaling the water saturation to the flowing saturation window, we get a (new or another) normalized water saturation value

and a normalized oil saturation value

Endpoints 
Let  be oil relative permeability, and let  be water relative permeability. There are two ways of scaling phase permeability (i.e. effective permeability of the phase). If we scale phase permeability w.r.t. absolute water permeability (i.e. ), we get an endpoint parameter for both oil and water relative permeability. If we scale phase permeability w.r.t. oil permeability with irreducible water saturation present,  
 endpoint is one, and we are left with only the  endpoint parameter. In order to satisfy both options in the mathematical model, it is common to use two endpoint symbols in the model for two-phase relative permeability.
The endpoints / endpoint parameters of oil and water relative permeabilities are

These symbols have their merits and limits. It occurs at irreducible water saturation, and it is the largest value of  that can occur for initial water saturation. The competing endpoint symbol  occurs in imbibition flow in oil-gas systems. If the permeability basis is oil with irreducible water present, then . The symbol  emphasizes that it is occurring at the residual oil saturation.

The oil and water relative permeability models are then written as

There are often many symbols in articles that discuss relative permeability models and modelling. A number of busy core analysts, reservoir engineers and scientists often skip using tedious and time-consuming subscripts, and write e.g. A variety of symbols are therefore to be expected, and accepted as long as they are explained or defined.

The effects that slip or no-slip boundary conditions in pore flow have on endpoint parameters, are discussed by Berg et alios.

Corey-model 
An often used approximation of relative permeability is the Corey correlation

which is a power law in saturation. The Corey correlations of the relative permeability for oil and water are then

If the permeability basis is normal oil with irreducible water present, then .

In case of gas-water system or gas-oil system there are Corey correlations similar to the oil-water relative permeabilities correlations shown above.

LET-model 
The Corey-correlation or Corey model has only one degree of freedom for the shape of each relative permeability curve, the shape parameter N.
The LET-correlation
 adds more degrees of freedom in order to accommodate the shape of relative permeability curves in SCAL experiments and in 3D reservoir models that are adjusted to match historic production. These adjustments frequently includes relative permeability curves and endpoints.

The LET-type approximation is described by 3 parameters L, E, T. The correlation for water and oil relative permeability with water injection is thus

and

written using the same  normalization as for Corey.

The parameter L describes the lower part of the curve, and by similarity and experience the L-values are comparable to the appropriate Corey parameter. The parameter T describes the upper part (or the top part) of the curve in a similar way that the L-parameter describes the lower part of the curve. The parameter E describes the position of the slope (or the elevation) of the curve. A value of one is a neutral value, and the position of the slope is governed by the L- and T-parameters. Increasing the value of the E-parameter pushes the slope towards the high end of the curve. Decreasing the value of the E-parameter pushes the slope towards the lower end of the curve. Experience using the LET correlation indicates the following reasonable ranges for the parameters L, E, and T: L ≥ 0.1, E > 0 and T ≥ 0.1.

In case of gas-water system or gas-oil system there are LET correlations similar to the oil-water relative permeabilities correlations shown above.

Evaluations 
After Morris Muskat et alios established the concept of relative permeability in late 1930'ies, the number of correlations, i.e. models, for relative permeability has steadily increased. This creates a need for evaluation of the most common correlations at the current time. Two of the latest (per 2019) and most thorough evaluations are done by Moghadasi et alios and by Sakhaei et alios. Moghadasi et alios
evaluated Corey, Chierici and LET correlations for oil/water relative permeability using a sophisticated method that takes into account the number of uncertain model parameters. They found that LET, with the largest number (three) of uncertain parameters, was clearly the best one for both oil and water relative permeability. Sakhaei et alios
evaluated 10 common and widely used relative permeability correlations for gas/oil and gas/condensate systems, and found that LET showed best agreement with experimental values for both gas and oil/condensate relative permeability.

Relative permeability versus TEM-function 
Relative permeability is just one of the factors that affect fluid flow dynamics, and therefore can’t fully capture dynamic flow behavior of porous media. A criterion/metric has been established to characterize dynamic characteristics of rocks, known as True Effective Mobility or TEM-function. TEM-function is a function of Relative permeability, Porosity, permeability and fluid Viscosity, and can be determined for each fluid phase separately. TEM-function has been derived from Darcy's law for multiphase flow.

in which k is the permeability, kr is the Relative permeability, φ is the Porosity, and μ is the fluid Viscosity.
Rocks with better fluid dynamics (i.e., experiencing a lower pressure drop in conducting a fluid phase) have higher TEM versus saturation curves. Rocks with lower TEM versus saturation curves resemble low quality systems.

While TEM-function controls the dynamic behavior of a system, the Relative permeability alone has conventionally been used to classify different fluid flow systems. Despite Relative permeability is itself a function of several parameters including permeability, Porosity and Viscosity, the dynamic behavior of systems may not necessarily be fully captured by this single source of information and, if used, it can even result in misleading interpretations.

TEM-function in analyzing Relative permeability data is analogous with Leverett J-function in analyzing Capillary pressure data.

Averaging Relative permeability curves 

In multiphase systems Relative permeability curves of each fluid phase (i.e., water, oil, gas, CO2) can be averaged using the concept of TEM-function as:

See also

 TEM-function
 Permeability (earth sciences)
 Capillary pressure
 Imbibition
 Drainage
 Buckley–Leverett equation

References

External links
 Relative Permeability Curves

Fluid dynamics
Porous media